Major General Ewen George Sinclair-MacLagan,  (24 December 1868 – 24 November 1948) was an officer in the British Army who fought in British India and the Second Boer War. He was later seconded to the Australian Army and served with the Australian Imperial Force during the First World War. During the latter stages of the war, he commanded the 4th Australian Division. After the war, he returned to service with the British Army. He retired in 1925 and died in Dundee, Scotland at the age of 79.

Early life
Ewen George Sinclair-MacLagan was born in Edinburgh, Scotland on 24 December 1868 to the banker  Robert Ewen Sinclair-Maclagan and his wife Mary Alice Wall. He attended the United Services College in North Devon, England, where Rudyard Kipling was one of his classmates.

Military career
After serving in the local militia, Sinclair-MacLagan was commissioned as a second lieutenant in the Border Regiment in 1889. He served in British India and participated in campaigns in the Waziristan region. From 1899 to 1901 he fought in the Boer War in South Africa where, as a captain, he served as a company commander in the 1st Battalion of the Border Regiment.  During his service during the war, he was mentioned in despatches and won the Distinguished Service Order.

In 1901, Sinclair-MacLagan was seconded to the Australian Army and served as adjutant of the New South Wales Scottish Rifles. After three years in Australia, he returned to his regiment in England. In 1910, he was a major and serving with the Yorkshire Regiment when the then Brigadier William Bridges, who knew Sinclair-MacLagan from his time in Australia, offered him a position as a drill instructor at the newly established Royal Military College at Duntroon. Sinclair-MacLagan accepted the position and returned to Australia as a lieutenant colonel.

First World War
Upon the outbreak of the First World War, Bridges was instructed to form the Australian Imperial Force (AIF) for service overseas. He selected Sinclair-MacLagan to be the commander of 3rd Brigade, 1st Division. Sinclair-MacLagan was the only brigade commander of the division to be a professional soldier. He oversaw the training of the brigade, most of whom were miners, in the Middle East.

Gallipoli
Sinclair-MacLagan's brigade was selected to be the lead element of the division when it landed at Gallipoli on 25 April 1915. On reaching the high ground at Plugge's Plateau, he quickly realised that his brigade had been landed in the wrong position. Making the best of a confusing situation, he directed his forces to secure Baby 700, a prominent feature overlooking the ANZAC positions. This could not be done, and he opted to establish positions on what would become known as the Second Ridge. Exhausted after dealing with Turkish counterattacks the following day, he was relieved of his command. After a period of rest, Sinclair-MacLagan returned to his brigade but was medically evacuated in August. He resumed command of the brigade in January 1916, at which stage it was reforming in Egypt after being evacuated from Gallipoli.

Western Front
The 3rd Brigade, with Sinclair-MacLagan still in command, participated in the Battles of Pozières and Mouquet Farm from July to September 1916. He left his brigade in December 1916 to become commander of the AIF depots in England. He was appointed a Companion of the Order of the Bath in February 1917 for his war service to date. He returned to the Western Front in July 1917 when the commander of the 4th Division, Major General William Holmes, was killed shortly after the Battle of Messines. Sinclair-MacLagan was to take over command of the division, which he would lead for the remainder of the war.

Promoted to temporary major general, Sinclair-MacLagan had little opportunity to stamp his mark on the division before the upcoming Battle of Passchendaele, but it performed well in the Battle of Polygon Wood. Its next major engagement was in March 1918 when it was rushed to the Somme sector to counter the German spring offensive. It took up positions on the Ancre and rebuffed several attempts by the Germans to break through. In September, the 4th Division relieved the 5th Division in the line and participated in the attacks on the Hindenburg Line. He also led the Australian mission that assisted in the training of the II American Corps, American Expeditionary Forces, prior to its participation in the successful Battle of St. Quentin Canal.

After the war, Sinclair-MacLagan's rank of major general was made substantive, in lieu of the knighthood that other divisional commanders of the AIF received. In May 1919, his service with the AIF was terminated. He received a number of awards for his wartime services. His time assisting the American Expeditionary Forces was rewarded with the Distinguished Service Medal. He also received the Croix de guerre with palm from the French government, and the Commander's Cross of the Order of the White Eagle from the Serbian government. In late 1919, he was appointed a Companion of the Order of St Michael and St George.

Later life
Sinclair-MacLagan returned to duty with the British Army and served as commander of the 51st Highland Division before retiring in 1925. He retained a connection to the Australian Army through his honorary colonelcy of the 34th Battalion. He was also colonel of the Border Regiment from 1923 to 1936. He died in Dundee, Scotland on 24 November 1948. He was survived by his daughter, the only child of his marriage to Edith Kathleen French, the daughter of George Arthur French. His wife had died in 1928.

Notes

References

1868 births
1948 deaths
British Army major generals
British Army generals of World War I
Australian generals
Australian military personnel of World War I
Companions of the Order of the Bath
Companions of the Order of St Michael and St George
Companions of the Distinguished Service Order
People educated at United Services College
Military personnel from Edinburgh
Border Regiment officers
British Army personnel of the Second Boer War
Recipients of the Croix de Guerre (France)
Recipients of the Distinguished Service Medal (United States)